Québékoisie is a Canadian documentary film, directed by Mélanie Carrier and Olivier Higgins and released in 2013. The film documents a bicycle trip undertaken by the duo along Quebec Route 138 between Quebec City and Natashquan, to explore the relationship between Quebec's indigenous and non-indigenous populations.

The film premiered in 2013 at the Montreal International Documentary Festival, where it won the Magnus Isaacson Award for socially conscious filmmaking.

The film received a Jutra Award nomination for Best Documentary Film at the 16th Jutra Awards in 2014.

References

External links

2013 films
2013 documentary films
Canadian documentary films
Quebec films
Documentary films about First Nations
Documentary films about Quebec
French-language Canadian films
2010s Canadian films